Robert Troughton (17 June 1904 – 17 August 1988) was an Australian rules footballer who played with Geelong in the Victorian Football League (VFL) during the early 1930s. 

Troughton played as both a wingman and rover, also at times used up forward. He started his career at Broken Hill Football League club North Broken Hill before moving to Adelaide to play for South Australian National Football League (SANFL) club West Torrens, topping their goalkicking in 1928 and 1929. Geelong recruited him for the 1930 VFL season and he played in their losing Grand Final that year and their premiership the following season.

References

External links

1904 births
1988 deaths
Australian rules footballers from New South Wales
Geelong Football Club players
Geelong Football Club Premiership players
West Torrens Football Club players
North Broken Hill Football Club players
One-time VFL/AFL Premiership players